, or  , is a public research university located in Kyoto, Japan. Founded in 1897, it is one of the former Imperial Universities and the second oldest university in Japan. KyotoU is consistently ranked amongst the top two in Japan, the top ten in Asia, and the world's top fifty institutions of higher education.

Founded upon the principles of its motto, “freedom of academic culture”, KyotoU is currently composed of three campuses with ten Faculties, eighteen Graduate Schools, thirteen Research Institutes, and twenty-two Research and Educational Centers. The Kyoto University Library, boasting over 7 million volumes, is Japan's second-largest academic library.
Furthermore, KyotoU was one of the first three Designated National Universities and is categorized by the Japanese government as a Top Type university in the Top Global University Project. As of March 2019, the university's total net assets were valued at 316 billion JPY. Advocating for international collaboration in education and research, KyotoU has partnerships with various academic institutions outside Japan.

Kyoto University has generated 5 prime ministers of Japan and 1 president of Taiwan to date, and is famed for producing world-class researchers. As of October 2019, 19 Nobel Prize laureates, 2 Fields medalists, and 1 Gauss Prize winner have been affiliated with Kyoto University, giving it the most Nobel laureates of all universities in Asia. Apart from distinguished politicians and scholars, the university also counts in its alumni esteemed medical and legal professionals, writers, artists, and business leaders. KyotoU was ranked twelfth globally in Time's Higher Education's Alma Mater (Global Executives) Index in 2017, indicating the influence of its alumni on the business world. In addition, the university is the birthplace of the Kyoto School of philosophy, known for its discourse on religion and the meaning of "nothingness".

History 

Kyoto University's forerunner was the  founded in Osaka in 1869, which, despite its name, taught physics as well ( is a transcription of a Dutch word chemie).

 as a part of the Imperial University system was established on June 18, 1897, using the Third Higher School's buildings. The higher school moved to a patch of land across the street, where the Yoshida South Campus stands today, and was integrated into Kyoto University in May 1949 and became the College of Liberal Arts in September 1949. In the same year of the university's establishment, the College of Science and Technology was founded. The College of Law and the College of Medicine were founded in 1899, the College of Letters in 1906, expanding the university's activities to areas outside natural science.

Kyoto University has since 2004 been incorporated as a national university corporation under a new law which applies to all national universities.

The university's Department of Geophysics and their Disaster Prevention Research Institute are represented on the national Coordinating Committee for Earthquake Prediction.

Campuses 

The university has three campuses in Yoshida, Kyoto; in Katsura, Kyoto; in Gokashō, Uji

Yoshida Campus is the main campus, with some laboratories located in Uji. The Graduate School of Engineering is currently under process of moving to the newly built Katsura Campus.

Organization
The university has about 22,000 students enrolled in its undergraduate and graduate programs.

Faculties

Kyoto University has 10 faculties.
 Faculty of Integrated Human Studies
 Faculty of Letters
 Faculty of Education
 Faculty of Law
 Faculty of Economics
 Faculty of Science
 Faculty of Medicine
 Faculty of Pharmaceutical Sciences
 Faculty of Engineering
 Faculty of Agriculture

Graduate schools 
Kyoto University has 19 graduate schools.

Academic 

 Graduate School of Letters
 Graduate School of Education
 Graduate School of Law
 Graduate School of Economics
 Graduate School of Science
 Graduate School of Medicine
 Graduate School of Pharmaceutical Sciences
 Graduate School of Engineering
 Graduate School of Agriculture
 Graduate School of Human and Environmental Studies
 Graduate School of Energy Science
 Graduate School of Asian and African Area Studies
 Graduate School of Informatics
 Graduate School of Biostudies
 Graduate School of Global Environmental Studies

Professional 
 School of Government
 Graduate School of Management
 Kyoto University Law School
 Kyoto University School of Public Health

Academics 

Kyoto University promotes itself as an academic institution fostering a "spirit of freedom". The university claims eleven Nobel Laureates and two Fields Medalists among its faculty and alumni. The university is also known as the starting point for the Kyoto School philosophical movement.

Notable research institutes and facilities 
 Yukawa Institute for Theoretical Physics
 Research Institute for Mathematical Sciences
 Primate Research Institute
 Kosobe Conservatory
 Seto Marine Biological Laboratory

Academic rankings

Kyoto University is considered one of the most prestigious universities in Japan, and is consistently ranked second in Japan and in the top ten in Asia by Academic Ranking of World Universities, Times Higher Education, QS World University Rankings.

The university was ranked 3rd in 2008 and 2010 in the ranking "Truly Strong Universities" by Toyo Keizai. In another ranking, Japanese prep school Kawaijuku ranked Kyodai as the 2nd best university in Japan.

Research performance
Kyodai is usually considered one of the top research institution in Japan. In fact, it has the second largest number of investment from Grants-in-Aid for Scientific Research, which is the national grants program for research institutions.

This financial support from the Japanese government has a direct effect on Kyodai's research outcomes. According to Thomson Reuters, Kyodai is the No.1 research university in Japan. Its research excellence is especially distinctive in Chemistry (1st in Japan, 4th in the world), Biology & Biochemistry (2nd in Japan, 23rd in the world), Pharmacology & Toxicology (2nd in Japan, 30th in the world), Immunology (3rd in Japan, 25th in the world), Material Science (4th in Japan, 22nd in the world), and Physics (4th in Japan, 25th in the world).

In another ranking, Nikkei Shimbun on 2004/2/16 surveyed about the research standards in Engineering studies based on Thomson Reuters, Grants in Aid for Scientific Research and questionnaires to the heads of 93 leading Japanese Research Centers. Kyodai was placed in the 10th position (research planning ability 6th) in this ranking.

Kyodai also has a high research standard in Social Sciences & Humanities. Repec in January 2011 ranked Kyodai's Institute of Economic Research as Japan's 3rd best economic research institution. Kyodai has provided 6 presidents of the Japanese Economic Association in its 42-year history, which is the 3rd largest number.

Asahi Shimbun summarized the number of academic papers in Japanese major legal journals by university, and Kyodai was ranked 6th for the period between 2005 and 2009.

Graduate school rankings
Kyodai Law School is considered one of the top law schools in Japan. From 2007 to 2017, it was ranked 2nd out of the 74 law schools in Japan for bar examination pass ratio, at 79.93%.
In 2019, Kyodai Law School became 1st out of the 72 law schools in Japan, with a pass ratio of 62.69%.

Eduniversal ranked Japanese business schools, and the Faculty of Economics in Kyodai is placed 4th in Japan (111th in the world).

Kyoto University has the second highest deviation and difficulty level after the University of Tokyo as a university in Japan.

Alumni rankings
Kyodai alumni are distinctively successful in Japanese industries such as shown below.

According to the Weekly Economist's 2010 rankings, graduates from Kyodai have the 10th best employment rate in 400 major companies in Japan. However, it has to be noted that this lower ranking position is because of the large number of alumni who become government bureaucrats, which is 2nd largest among Japanese universities. In fact, alumni of Kyodai's average salary is the 5th best in Japan, according to the PRESIDENT.

Mines ParisTech : Professional Ranking World Universities ranks Kyodai as 5th in the world in 2011 in terms of the number of alumni listed among CEOs in the 500 largest worldwide companies.

Popularity and selectivity
Kyodai is one of the most selective universities in Japan. Its entrance difficulty is usually considered one of the top among 180 national and public universities.

Evaluation from Business World

Athletics 

Kyoto University competes in 48 sports. The university is a member of the Kansai Big Six Baseball League.

Controversy 

Members of the university's American football team, the Kyoto University Gangsters, were arrested in 2006 for gang rape, which had been recently added to the Penal Code in January 2005 following the Super Free rape controversy. The three students had forced a female university student to drink liquor to the point of unconsciousness, at which point they gang-raped her. They were all convicted.

Notable people 

Notable people from academic are eleven Nobel Prize winners, Fields Medal winners Heisuke Hironaka (1970) and Shigefumi Mori (1990) and one Carl Friedrich Gauss Prize winner Kiyosi Itô. In addition, the lecturer against vaccine conspiracies received the John Maddox Prize: Riko Muranaka, winner in 2017 for her combat of anti-HPV vaccination.

See also 
 List of Nobel laureates affiliated with Kyoto University
 Kikuchi Dairoku
 List of National Treasures of Japan (archaeological materials)
 Yoshida dormitory, Kyoto University
 Hitoshi Okamura

Notes

References

External links 

 Kyoto University
 The 10th US-Japan Symposium on Drug Delivery Systems

 
Kansai Six (original)
Kansai Big Six
Japanese national universities
National Seven Universities
Forestry education
1897 establishments in Japan
Educational institutions established in 1897
Super Global Universities
Kansai Collegiate American Football League